Samuel Onofrio Haggerty (born May 26, 1994) is an American professional baseball infielder & outfielder for the Seattle Mariners of Major League Baseball (MLB). He previously played for the New York Mets.

Career
Haggerty attended Mullen High School in Denver, Colorado. Haggerty attended the University of New Mexico, where he played college baseball for the Lobos. In his first year, Haggerty was awarded as the co-Freshman of the Year of the Mountain West Conference and named to the Louisville Slugger Freshmen All-American team. In 2014, he played collegiate summer baseball with the Hyannis Harbor Hawks of the Cape Cod Baseball League.

Cleveland Indians
Haggerty was drafted by the Cleveland Indians in the 24th round of the 2015 MLB Draft.

Haggerty played for the Mahoning Valley Scrappers in 2015, hitting .283/.361/.453/.814 with 1 home run and 7 RBI. He played for the Lake County Captains in 2016, hitting .230/.323/.320/.643 with 4 home runs and 39 RBI.

In 2017, he spent the season with the Lynchburg Hillcats, hitting .253/.355/.398/.753 with 3 home runs, 32 RBI, and 49 stolen bases. In 2018, he split the year between the Akron RubberDucks and the Columbus Clippers, combining to hit .239/.369/.384/.753 with 4 home runs and 39 RBI.

New York Mets
On January 6, 2019, Haggerty and Walker Lockett were traded to the New York Mets in exchange for Kevin Plawecki. He split the 2019 minor leagues season between the Brooklyn Cyclones, Binghamton Rumble Ponies, and the Syracuse Mets, hitting .271/.369/.387/.756 with 3 home runs and 26 RBI.

On September 1, 2019, the Mets selected Haggerty's contract and promoted him to the major leagues. He made his major league debut on September 4 as a pinch runner versus the Washington Nationals. On December 24, 2019, Haggerty was designated for assignment.

Seattle Mariners
Haggerty was claimed off waivers by the Seattle Mariners on January 10, 2020. Haggerty began his Mariners tenure with an 8-game hitting streak and ended the season slashing .260/.315/.400 with 4 stolen bases across 13 games.

On April 13, 2021, Haggerty hit a home run to Eutaw Street at Oriole Park at Camden Yards, becoming only the second Mariner to do so after Ken Griffey Jr. On June 7, 2021, Haggerty was placed on the 60-day injured list with right shoulder inflammation. On October 22, Haggerty was outrighted off of the 40-man roster.

In 2022, Haggerty received a non-roster invite to Mariners Spring Training and began the season in AAA with the Tacoma Rainiers. He was selected to the Mariners’ active roster on May 22. He was optioned down on June 17, but recalled on June 29. On July 14, 2022, Haggerty hit the Mariners' first inside-the-park home run in fifteen years. His season came to an end on October 3rd, just days before the Mariners' first playoff appearance since 2001, when he sustained a groin injury while successfully stealing second base. Haggerty finished the year with a .256 batting average, a .738 OPS (on base plus slugging), 13 stolen bases and 45 hits in 83 games played and 201 at-bats.

Personal life 
Haggerty is known for using the theme music from "The Godfather" for his walk-up music, choosing it to honor his mother and his Italian heritage.

His brash playing style and personal flair earned him the nickname "Ham Swaggerty" with fans and broadcasting crews.

References

External links

New Mexico Lobos bio

1994 births
Living people
Baseball players from Phoenix, Arizona
Major League Baseball infielders
New York Mets players
Seattle Mariners players
New Mexico Lobos baseball players
Hyannis Harbor Hawks players
Mahoning Valley Scrappers players
Lake County Captains players
Lynchburg Hillcats players
Akron RubberDucks players
Columbus Clippers players
Brooklyn Cyclones players
Binghamton Rumble Ponies players
Syracuse Mets players
Leones del Escogido players
Tacoma Rainiers players
American expatriate baseball players in the Dominican Republic
Eau Claire Express players